Jack Gilman (born John Joseph Gilman, December 22, 1925, Green Bay, Wisconsin – September 10, 2009, Los Angeles, California) was a world-renowned material scientist in the field of mechanical properties of solids. In his lifetime he made major contributions to many areas of the field including dislocation behaviour of ceramics, disclination behaviour of polymers, and production of metal glasses.

Life 
John J. Gilman was born as John Joseph Gilman on December 25, 1925, in Green Bay, Wisconsin. In 1946, he received both his Bachelor of Science in mechanical engineering and his Master of Science from the Illinois Institute of Technology. In 1952, Gilman received PhD in physical metallurgy from Columbia University. In 1952, he briefly worked at the Crucible Steel Company of America as a steel researcher and subsequently worked at the General Electric Research Laboratory that same year. While working at the General Electric laboratory, he expanded his studies in mechanical properties and the structure of single crystals.

After leaving General Electric in 1960, Gilman became a professor of engineering at Brown University. He moved to University of Illinois as a professor of physics and metallurgy in 1963. In 1968, he became director of the Materials Research Center at Allied Chemical. At Allied, he worked on metallic glasses. In 1978, he became director of the Corporate Development Center. In 1980, he became a research manager at Standard Oil. In 1981, he became a director of Amoco Battery Technology. In 1985, he became a director of the Center for Advanced Materials at Lawrence Berkeley National Laboratory at the University of California, Berkeley. In 1987, he became a senior scientist studying the crystalline structure and mechanical properties of solids. In 1993, he became an adjunct professor at the University of California, Los Angeles.

Discoveries

In all, 330 scientific papers were published under his name on topics including metals, ceramics, glasses, semiconductors, polymers, diamond and nano-materials. Gilman was editor and co-editor of three books and author of four. His work also resulted in him acquiring several patents including one for rhenium boride compounds to be used as abrasives, cutting tools and as protective coatings. Gilman is known for his contributions to the field of material science (dislocations in ceramics, disclinations in polymers, and new metal glasses).

Gilman designed a tetrahedral truss different from Buckminster Fuller's famous 1953 truss in 1981. Gilman attributed the strength of his tetrahedral truss to "the inherent rigidity of the skeletal triangle" and "the rigidity of the basic tetrahedron".

Honours
For his contributions to material science and research management in industry Professor Gilman received honours and recognitions worldwide.

References

External links
 ASM: Tribute to Jack Gilman

1925 births
2009 deaths
People from Green Bay, Wisconsin
Illinois Institute of Technology alumni
Columbia School of Engineering and Applied Science alumni
General Electric people
Brown University faculty
UCLA Henry Samueli School of Engineering and Applied Science faculty
University of Illinois faculty
American materials scientists
Fellows of the Minerals, Metals & Materials Society